Colworth is a hamlet in the Chichester district of West Sussex, England. It lies just off the A259 road 2.7 mile (4.4 km) north of Bognor Regis. At the 2011 census the population of the hamlet was included in the civil parish of Oving.

History 
In 988 AD King Æthelred the Unready granted four hides at Colworth to his minister Leofstan, with leave to bequeath it to whom he would. A chapel at Colworth is referred to in Sussex county records in 1510. The disused Portsmouth and Arundel Canal, which was abandoned in 1855, passes through the hamlet.

References

External links

Villages in West Sussex